Yucca Valley High School is in the town of Yucca Valley, California. The school has 1,690 students in grades 9–12. The principal is Mr Monical. The school is part of the Morongo Unified School District. The official mascot is the Trojan and the school colors are black and gold.

Academics

A variety of academic courses are offered at YVHS, with classes such as Field Ecology and Acting. YVHS teaches Spanish, French, German, and Latin, and it is one of the few high schools in California to offer Latin as a second language. But that individual has to take two years of French or Spanish to take German or Latin.

A Career Pathways program allots over 300 job shadow opportunities for students every year.  Pathways students also are offered internships and they are awarded a scholarship based on the hours completed in their internship.

History

A school newspaper, The Odyssey, began being published in the school's first year. For many years, it was published through local newspaper Hi-Desert Star. The Odyssey relaunched in May 2018 as an online publication.

Jason Harvey became a professional golfer due to the wonderful golf program. To this day, he promotes and grows the golf team.

Extracurricular activities

Arts
Yucca Valley High School offers opportunities for students to express themselves artistically and culturally. In addition to music classes and art classes, YVHS has a marching band and an art club.

Theatre Company
The YVHS Theatre Company, a theatrical organization on campus, produces three performances a year.

The YVHS Theatre Company was started in 1994. The YVHS Drama Club was officially chartered at the start of the 1996-97 school year.  In 1997, the YVHS Drama Club affiliated itself with the International Thespian Society of Cincinnati, Ohio, and became I.T.S. troupe 5589.

Athletics
Yucca Valley High School is part of the Desert Valley League. Athletic programs include boys’ and girls' tennis, wrestling and cross country running.

There are three wrestling teams: boys varsity, girls varsity and a JV boys team. The wrestling team hosts the annual "Trojan War" wrestling competition, for which other high school teams are invited to compete against YVHS's team. The team has had several state placers and also two-time state placers: an athlete placed 8th in the 2005–2006 season and 2nd in the 2006–2007 season.

The girls' cross country program has qualified for the California state meet the last four years in a row (2003–2006).

Administration

Trimesters
Yucca Valley High School used trimesters from the 1997-98 school year to the 2003-04 school year.  Under the trimester system, there were three trimesters in a year instead of two semesters, and only five classes per day rather than six.  YVHS reverted to the semester system for the 2004-2005 school year after seven years on the trimester system.

Policy Changes
Due to a lawsuit in 2006, YVHS adopted a "split" lunch policy in the second semester of the 2006-2007 school year. Under the new policy, YVHS had two lunch breaks each day.  While the new system provided students with more time to receive their food in the often-crowded cafeteria, this policy has been detrimental to the many clubs on campus that meet during lunch. In the second semester of 2013-2014, the school changed the policy back to one lunch.

Expansion and Modernization 
The school board planned to construct expansion buildings by the 2010 school year. Also, a new 2-story building was built in 2014 and is in use for the English courses, and has a lecture hall.
The baseball field on campus has grass in the outfield.

Footnotes

External links
 Yucca Valley High School homepage
 Morongo Unified School District homepage
 YVHS Theatre Company

1969 establishments in California
Yucca Valley, California
High schools in San Bernardino County, California
Public high schools in California